Arababad (also Romanized as ‘Arabābād) is a village in Miankuh Rural District, Chapeshlu District, Dargaz County, Razavi Khorasan Province, Iran. At the 2006 census, its population was 34, in 8 families.

See also 

 List of cities, towns and villages in Razavi Khorasan Province

References 

Populated places in Dargaz County